Mohammad Abdul Hadi commonly known as M A Hadi was a Bangladeshi academic who served as the 4th Vice Chancellor of Bangabandhu Sheikh Mujib Medical University.

Early life and education 
Hadi was born on 31 December 1941. He passed MBBS from Dhaka Medical College in 1964. He gained  FCPS from Bangladesh College of Physicians and Surgeons in Surgery in 1973.

Career 
Hadi served as the director general of Directorate General of Health Services, and the President of Bangladesh Medical Association, Bangladesh College of Physicians and Surgeons (BCPS), Bangladesh Medical Research Council (BMRC) and Doctors' Association of Bangladesh. He was also the Principal of Dhaka Medical College and Dean of Faculty of Medicine, University of Dhaka.

Award and honors 
He was also awarded FICS (Urology) from the International College of Surgeons in 1993, FRCP from the Royal College of Physicians, Edinburgh in 1995, FCPS from the College of Physicians and Surgeons, Pakistan, 1999, FRCP&S from the Royal College of Physicians and Surgeons, Glasgow in 2005.

References

2007 deaths
Place of birth missing
Academic staff of Dhaka Medical College and Hospital
1941 births